Candida Xu or Candida Su (September 4, 1607 – July 24, 1680), was a Chinese Catholic. She has been called "arguably the most influential Chinese Christian woman of the seventeenth century."

Biography 
Born on the feast day of Saint Candida the Elder, in whose honor she was named, Xu was the granddaughter of Xu Guangqi, who had converted to Christianity four years previously. From childhood she was deeply religious. Widowed at 46, she turned her attention to service to the church. Despite the restrictions she faced given her status as a member of the upper class, she worked to spread the word of Christianity. She exercised the influence of her father and son to gain good will for many Jesuit missionaries among local officials. Among Chinese Christians she promoted her spiritual associations; she also acted as a leader for Christian women around Shanghai. She had a private income, from which she donated generously to finance living arrangements for missionaries; she also funded the building of close to forty churches and chapels, and facilitated publication of many religious works in the Chinese language. She helped the Catholic Church in Sichuan search for surviving converts after the devastation wrought by Zhang Xianzhong. She was referred to as the Apostle of China by many. Her story gained currency in Europe through a biography by Philippe Couplet, her confessor.

References

1607 births
1680 deaths
Chinese Roman Catholics
Chinese women philanthropists
Chinese philanthropists
17th-century philanthropists
17th-century Chinese women
17th-century Chinese people